The following lists events that happened during 1865 in the French Empire.

Incumbents
 Monarch – Napoleon III

Events
1 January - The French government suppresses promulgation of the Papal "Syllabus of Errors" from the pulpit.
3 November - Opening of the first Printemps department store, in Paris.
6 December - Treaty with Monaco.
Count Alexandre Colonna-Walewski, son of Napoleon, becomes President of the Corps législatif.
Flag reformed.

Arts and literature
1 January - Hector Berlioz finishes his memoirs.
Édouard Manet's painting Olympia is first exhibited, at the Salon (Paris), and causes controversy.
Jean-François Millet's painting The Angelus (L'Angélus) is first exhibited and becomes very popular in France.

Births
20 January - Yvette Guilbert, singer and actress (died 1944)
9 June - Albéric Magnard, composer (died 1914)
23 September - Baroness Emma Orczy, writer (died 1947)
1 October - Paul Dukas, composer and teacher (died 1935)
8 December - Jacques Hadamard, mathematician (died 1963)

Deaths
19 January - Pierre-Joseph Proudhon, political philosopher (born 1809)
16 February - Louis Pierre Gratiolet, anatomist and zoologist (born 1815)
13 April - Achille Valenciennes, zoologist (born 1794)
18 April - Léon Jean Marie Dufour, medical doctor and naturalist (born 1780)
30 March - Gustave de Beaumont, magistrate, prison reformer and travel companion to Alexis de Tocqueville (born 1802)
21 November - Jean-Claude-Léonard Baveux, priest and missionary in Canada (born 1796)
Full date unknown - César Lecat de Bazancourt, military historian (born 1810)

References

1860s in France